Etchemendy is a surname of Basque origin meaning 'the mountain with a house(s) on it'. Notable people with the surname include:

John Etchemendy (born 1952), American logician
Nancy Etchemendy (born 1952), American writer
Pascale Etchemendy (born 1966), French tennis player

Basque-language surnames